Elton Basriu (born 3 August 1987 in Elbasan) is an Albanian professional footballer who plays for KF Dukagjini in the Football Superleague of Kosovo.

References

1987 births
Living people
Footballers from Elbasan
Albanian footballers
Association football defenders
Association football midfielders
KF Elbasani players
KF Butrinti players
KS Sopoti Librazhd players
KF Gramshi players
KF Apolonia Fier players
KF Tërbuni Pukë players
KF Bylis Ballsh players
FC Kamza players
KF Liria players
KF Trepça'89 players
Kategoria e Parë players
Kategoria Superiore players
Football Superleague of Kosovo players
Albanian expatriate footballers
Expatriate footballers in Kosovo
Albanian expatriate sportspeople in Kosovo